Beverly Afaglo Baah (born 28 May 1983) is a Ghanaian actress and TV presenter.

Personal life 
Beverly hails from the Volta Region in Ghana. She is married to Eugene Kwadwo Boadu Baah with a little entanglement  and they have two daughters.

Career 
Beverly trained as a Beauty Therapist at the FC Institute of Beauty Therapy, Ghana and is a former student of Ghana Institute of Journalism where she studied journalism and public relations. Aside acting, she operates Glamour Beauty Salon in Tema.

Selected filmography 

I love you But
Return of Beyonce 
Crime to Christ
Prince's Bride
Never Again
Single Six
Turn Me On
Bachelor’s
Equatorial Escape
Girls Connection
The King's Bride
Total Exchange
PlayBoy
Big Girls Club
CEO 
Sugar
Secret Burden
About to Wed
A Northern Affair (2014)
The Game (2010 film)
Sidechic Gang

Awards and nominations

References

1983 births
Living people
Ghanaian film actresses
Ghanaian television presenters
21st-century Ghanaian actresses
People from Volta Region
Ghanaian women television presenters